Douglas Arthur Peter Field (6 August 1945 – 7 March 2021), known as Duggie Fields, was a British artist who resided in Earls Court, London.

Early life
Fields was born in Salisbury, Wiltshire.  His parents were Henry Field and his wife Edna (née Rosenthal).  He grew up in the garrison town of Tidworth where his father owned a pharmacy, and later in Borehamwood, Hertfordshire.  He first came to notice in 1958, when he was 14, in the Summer Exhibition at the Bladon Gallery, Hurstbourne Tarrant, while he was attending the nearby Andover Grammar School.

Fields briefly studied architecture at Regent Street Polytechnic before studying at the Chelsea School of Art for four years from 1964.  He left with a scholarship that took him on his first visit to the United States, in 1968.

Career 
As a student, Fields' work progressed through minimal, conceptual and constructivist phases to a more hard-edged post-Pop figuration. His main influences were at that time Jackson Pollock, Mondrian and comic books, with a special regard for those worked on by Stan Lee. 

In 1968, Fields went to live in Earl's Court Square and shared a flat with Syd Barrett, who had just left Pink Floyd.  Fields continued to rent the flat and work in Barrett's former room, using it as his painting studio and remodelling the visual appearance of the property in his personal style. 

By the middle of the 1970s his work included many elements that were later defined as Post-modernist. In one painting, Marilyn Monroe is shown with her head severed. In 1983, Fields was invited to Tokyo by the Shiseido Corporation, where a gallery was created to show his paintings. For the occasion, the artist and his work were featured in a television, magazine, billboard and subway advertising campaign throughout Japan.

In 2002, he designed a poster for Transport for London. 

In 2013, he was taken to Los Angeles by artist and benefactor Amanda Eliasch with fashion designer Pam Hogg for Opfashart, which Eliasch had put together for "Britweek".

From 2013 to 2015, Fields worked for the preservation of Earls Court Exhibition Centre – designed in the 1930s by Howard Crane – and the surrounding area. The campaign was not successful but made people aware of the general decline of architecture in London.

In 2016, Fields was celebrated by the British Film Institute FLARE with a collection of his videos. The National Portrait Gallery, London holds two portraits of Fields, by photographers David Gwinnutt and Chris Garnham.

Fields also composed and recorded music which he accompanied with spoken word performances.

Exhibitions

Selected solo exhibitions
 1971 Hamet Gallery, London 
 1972 Bear Lane Gallery, Oxford
 1975 Kinsman-Morrison Gallery, London 
 1979 Kyle Gallery, London
 1980 Ikon Gallery, Birmingham; Midland Group, Nottingham; New 57 Gallery, Edinburgh; Roundhouse Gallery, London 
 1982 Spacex Gallery, Exeter; B2 Gallery, London
 1983 Shiseido Exhibition, Tokyo 
 1987 Albemarle Gallery, London 
 1991 Rempire Gallery, New York 
 2000 Random Retrospective, DuggieFields.com
 2008 Shifting Perspectives, Galleri Gl. Lejre, Denmark

The Arts Council and University College London have examples of Fields' paintings in their collections.

Selected group exhibitions
 1976 New London in New York, Hal Bromm Gallery, New York
 1979 The Figurative Show, Nicola Jacobs Gallery, London; Masks, The Ebury Gallery, London; Culture Shock, The Midland Group, Nottingham; Art and Artifice, B2 Gallery, London
 1983 Taste, Victoria and Albert Museum, London
 1984 The Male Nude, Homeworks Gallery, London
 1985 Image-Codes, Art about Fashion, The Australian Centre for Contemporary Art, Melbourne; VisualAid, Royal Academy, London
 1986 The Embellishment of the Statue of Liberty, Cooper Hewitt Museum/Barney's, New York
 1987 Twenty Artists Twenty Techniques, Albemarle Gallery, London
 1989 Fashion and Surrealism, Victoria and Albert Museum, London
 1988 Het Mannelisknaakt, Gallery Bruns, Amsterdam, St. Judes Gallery, London
 1990 Universal Language, Rempire Gallery, New York
 1993 Tranche d'Art Contemporain Anglais, Tutesaal, Luxembourg
 1998 Exquisite Corpse, Jibby Beane, London
 1999 Art 1999, Jibby Beane, London; Flesh, Blains Fine Art, London Nerve, I.C.A., London
 2000 Art 2000, Jibby Beane, London Up & Co., New York

References

External links

 

1945 births
People from Salisbury
English painters
English contemporary artists
Painters from London
2021 deaths